Several unusually large cuckoo clocks have been built and installed in different cities of the world with the aim of attracting visitors, as part of publicity of a cuckoo clock shop, or to serve as a landmark for the community and town.

Some have been awarded with the title of "World's Largest Cuckoo Clock" by the Guinness World Records.

Argentina
 Eduardo Castex, inaugurated in 1977.
 La Cumbrecita, 2011.
 La Falda, 1963.
 Villa Carlos Paz, 1958.

Brazil
 Gramado

Germany
Black Forest:
 Höllsteig (Breitnau), 1994.
 Niederwasser (Hornberg), 1995, cuckoo and quail clock.
 Schonach, 1980.
 Schonachbach (Triberg), 1994.
 Titisee-Neustadt
Villingen-Schwenningen, 2021.

Other parts of Germany:

 Gernrode, 1997.
 Sankt Goar, world's largest free-hanging cuckoo clock.
 Wiesbaden, 1946.

Italy
 Canazei, 2008, with carillon.

Russia
 Penza, 1974.

United Kingdom
 Pembridge, Herefordshire (England), 2013.

United States

Sugarcreek, Ohio, 1972, at the intersection of Main and Broadway Street. It is over 23 feet tall and 24 feet wide.
Douglasville, Georgia, 1986 (indoor). This clock was commissioned by Jerry Champion, owner of Champ's Clock Shop, in 1986. The manufacturer was Dold Exquisit and they had a retail location in Triberg Germany. Over 13 feet tall, it was made in the Black Forest and handcarved by Alfons Dold from German Black Forest trees.

References

Cuckoo clocks
Cuckoo clocks
Cuckoo clocks